Elections to Manchester City Council were held on Thursday, 2 May 1996. One third of the council was up for election, with each successful candidate to serve a four-year term of office, expiring in 2000. There were also two vacancies being contested; one in Blackley and the other in Woodhouse Park. The Labour Party retained overall control of the Council.

Election result

After the election, the composition of the council was as follows:

Ward results

Ardwick

Baguley

Barlow Moor

Benchill

Beswick and Clayton

Blackley

Bradford

Brooklands

Burnage

Central

Charlestown

Cheetham

Chorlton

Crumpsall

Didsbury

Fallowfield

Gorton North

Gorton South

Harpurhey

Hulme

Levenshulme

Lightbowne

Longsight

Moss Side

Moston

Newton Heath

Northenden

Old Moat

Rusholme

Sharston

Whalley Range

Withington

Woodhouse Park

By-elections between 1996 and 1998

References

1996 English local elections
1996
1990s in Manchester